Charles Innes may refer to:

Charles Hiller Innes (1870–1939), lawyer and politician in Massachusetts
Charles John Innes (1901–1971), lawyer and politician in Massachusetts
Charles Alexander Innes (1874–1959), Governor of the British Crown Colony of Burma
Charles Innes of the Innes baronets

See also
Charles Innes-Ker, Marquess of Bowmont and Cessford (born 1981), British aristocrat